The 2015 Best of Nollywood Awards was the 7th edition of the ceremony and took place in Ultra Modern Dome, Ondo State, Nigeria on December 13, 2015. The event was anchored by Nollywood actors, Bimbo Akintola and Gideon Okeke.

Awards

Best Actor in Leading Role (English)
Mike Omoregbee –  Invasion 1897
Sadiq Daba – October 1
IK Ogbonna – My Rich Boyfriend
Gabriel Afolayan – Ojuju
Okey Uzoeshi – The Date

Best Actor in Leading Role (Yoruba)       
Muyiwa Ademola -Fimidara Ire (Winner)
Lateef Adedimeji – Story like Mine
Odunlade Adekola – Torera
Bayo Alawiye  – Atanda
Femi Adebayo – Shadows

Best Actor in Leading Role (Hausa)
Ali Nuhu – Jinin Jikina (Winner)
Abdul Umar Shareef – Jinin Jikina

Best Actor in Leading Role (Igbo)
Chigozie Atuanya – Chetanna

Best Actress in Leading Role (English)
Nse Ikpe Etim – Stolen Water (Winner)
Stephanie Linus – Dry
Ini Edo – While you Slept
Hilda Dokubo – Stigma
Iyabo Ojo – Beyond Disability

Best Actress in Leading Role (Yoruba)
Fathia Balogun – Torera (Winner)
Tayo Sobola – Bella
Oyinka Elebuibon – Story like Mine
Laitan Ogungbili – Fimidara Ire
Aisha Lawal – Shadow

Best Actress in Leading Role (Hausa)
Rahma Sadau – Jinin Jikina
Fatima Washa – Ya’daga Allah

Best Actress Leading Role (Igbo)
Queen Nwokoye – Chetanna

Best Supporting Actor (English)
Alex Ekubo – My Rich Boyfriend
Kelechi Udegbe – Ojuju
Kalu Ikeagwu – Bad Drop (Winner)
Seun Akindele – Miss Taken
Blossom Chukwujekwu – Stolen Water

Best Supporting Actor (Yoruba)
Taiwo Ibikunle – Torera
Kunle Afod – Trust (Winner)
Yomi Gold – Bomilasiri
Niyi Johnson – Atanda
Yomi Fash Lanso – Story like Mine

Best Supporting Actor (Hausa)
Sadiq Sani Sadiq – Halacci
Yakubu Mohammed – Sai Lahira (Winner)

Best Supporting Actor (Igbo)
Tony Nkem – Chetanna
Osuji Spider – Chetanna (Winner)

Best Supporting Actress (English)
Omowunmi Dada  – Ojuju (Winner)
Mary Njoku – Stolen Water
Uche Jombo – Folly
Funke Akindele – One Fine Day
Liz Benson – Dry

Best Supporting Actress (Yoruba)
Ronke Odusanya – Owo Funfun
Temitope Solaja – Bella
Joke Muyiwa – Ayo Mi
Opeyemi Aiyeola – Alani Opomulero (Winner)
Eniola Ajao – Ere Ola

Best Supporting Actress (Hausa)
Nafisat Abdullahi – Ya’daga Allah (Winner)

Best Supporting Actress (Igbo) 
Ebere Okaro – Chetanna
Grace Okady – Chetanna
Ebube Nwagbo – Chetanna (Winner)

Most Promising Actor
Mustapha Solagbade – Trust
Olumide Oworu – Stolen Water
Kunle Rhemmy – The Date
Ademola Adedoyin – October 1
Osas Iyamu – Diary of the Triplets

Most Promising Actress
Bukunmi Oluwashina – Ayo Mi
Tayo Sobola – Bella
Owumi Ugbeye – Stolen Lives
Roseanna Marcel – One Minute Man
Omowumi Dada – Public Property

Best Child Actor 
Etochi Ejike Asiebgu - Little Ryan (Winner)
Daudu Muslin – Alia Story
Francess Okeke – B-ve

Best Child Actress 
Unigwe Princess – Butterfuy
Zubaida Ibrahim Fagge – Dry
Priscilla Ojo – Beyond Disability

Best Comedy Movie
Diary of the Triplets (Winner)
Stop
Iya Alatake

Movie with the Best Social Message 
 Dry (Winner)
Test
Code of Silence
Police Report
Beyond Disability

Movie with the Best Special Effects
Highjack (Winner)
Invasion 1897
Folly
Ashabul Khafi
Dry

Movie with the Best Screenplay
Dry (Winner)
October 1
Invasion 1897
Ojuju
Stigma

Best Short Film of the Year
Butterfly
Deluded
Keko
Retrospect
Switch

Best Documentary of the Year
Forgotten Generation
The World my Stage - Abimbola OgunsanyaBest TV Series of the Year
The JohnsonsTales of Eve (Winner)
So Wrong So Write
Hotel Majestic

Movie with the Best Editing
October 1
Invasion 1897
Dry
Ojuju

Best use of Nigerian Food in a Movie
Ayo Mi (Winner)
Kokumo
Corper Jide
Chetannah
Stolen Water

Movie with the Best Sound Track
Invasion 1897 (Winner)
Beyond Disability
Code of Silence
Dry
October 1

Movie with the Best Production Design
October 1 (Winner)
Invasion 1897
Stigma
Dry
Torera

Movie with the Best Cinematography
October 1
Dry (Winner)
Invasion 1897
Miss Taken
Stop

Best use of Nigerian Costume in a Movie
Torera
October 1 (Winner)
Invasion 1897
Owo Funfun
Stigma

Best use of Make-up in a Movie
Invasion 1897
Iya Alalake
October 1
Ojuju (Winner)
Common Man

Best use of Indigenous Nigerian Language in a movie
Stigma (Winner)
Ojuju
Blood and Romance
My Rich Boyfriend
Stop

Movie of the Year
October 1
Dry
Invasion 1897 (Winner)Stigma
Torera

Director of the Year
Kunle AfolayanLancelot ImaseunStephanie Linus
Dagogo Diminas
Abey Lanre

Best Kiss in a Movie
Yvonne Jegede and Seun Akindele - The Ex
Tope Osoba and Alex Ekubo - IfedolapoRoseanne Marcel and Okeowo Taiwo - One Minute Man (Winner)
Nse Ikpe Etim and Blossom Chukwujekwu - Stolen Water

Revelation of the Year (Male)
Rex Okozuwa
Deyemi Okanlawon
Laclass Ozougwu
Tobi Abraham
Akun Kolapo
Wasiu Rafiu

Revelation of the Year (Female)
Funmi Awelewa
Peggy Oviere
Jumoke Aderonmu
Wumi Toriola
Jumoke Odetola
Genny Uzoma

Recognition Awards
Goodluck Jonathan
Godswill Akpabio
Tade Ogidan
Patience Ozokwor

References

2015 in Nigerian cinema
Nollywood
2015